NeoN may refer to either of two enzymes, both catalyzing neomycin or its products:

 Neamine transaminase
 Neomycin C transaminase